Joshua James Rowbotham (born 7 January 1994) is an English footballer who plays as a defender for Marske United.

Career
Born in Stockton-on-Tees, Rowbotham made his senior debut for Hartlepool United in April 2011. He signed a new contract with the club in May 2014. He left the club by mutual consent in October 2014 in order to pursue a career away from professional football; he had been at the club for 11 years. He then played non-league football for Guisborough Town and West Auckland Town. He signed for Billingham Synthonia in February 2015, making 42 appearances for them in all competitions.

Career statistics

References

1994 births
Living people
English footballers
Hartlepool United F.C. players
Guisborough Town F.C. players
West Auckland Town F.C. players
Billingham Synthonia F.C. players
English Football League players
Association football defenders
Marske United F.C. players